Christ Church East is a constituency in the Christ Church area of Barbados represented in the House of Assembly of the Barbadian Parliament since 2018 by  Wilfred Abrahams MP of the Barbados Labour Party.

Since its founding in 1971 it has been a marginal constituency between the BLP and the DLP.

Boundaries 
From a point on the sea coast south of the terminus of the School Hill-St Christopher Road in a straight line to the terminus of the School Hill-St Christopher Road; thence in a northerly direction along the middle of the School Hill-St Christopher Road to its junction with Sayes Court-Hopewell Road; thence along the middle of Sayes Court-Hopewell Road to its junction with Highway U (the Hopewell-Chancery Lane Road); thence in a westerly direction along the middle of Highway U to its junction with Waverley Road: thence in a northerly direction along the middle of Waverley Road to its junction with Pegwell Boggs Road; thence in an easterly direction along the middle of Pegwell Boggs Road to its junction with Pegwell Boggs New Road; thence in a northerly direction along the middle of Pegwell Boggs New Road to its junction with Gibbons Road; thence in a westerly direction along the middle of Gibbons Road to its junction with Highway 7 (the Oistins-Airport Road); thence in a north easterly direction along Highway 7 to its junction with Highway S (the Providence-Balls Road); thence in northerly direction along the middle of Highway S to its junction with the ABC Highway; thence in a south westerly direction along the middle of the ABC Highway to its junction with Highway 6 at the Henry Forde Round-a-bout; thence in an easterly direction along the middle of Highway 6 (the Balls-St. Patricks Road) to its junction with Highway Q (the Balls-Lower Greys Road); thence in a north easterly direction along the middle of Highway Q to its junction with Highway R (the Pilgrim-Ridge Road); thence in a southerly direction along the middle of Highway R to its junction with the ABC Highway; thence in an easterly direction along the middle of the ABC Highway to a point near light pole #499; thence in a southerly direction with a straight line to its junction with the Fairy Valley Road; thence in an easterly direction along the middle of the Fairy Valley Road to its junction with the Seawell House-Paragon Road; thence along the middle of the Seawell House-Paragon Road to a straight line leading to a point on the Sea Coast south of Paragon House; thence in a westerly direction along the sea coast to a point on the coast south of the terminus of the School Hill-St. Christopher Road (the starting point).

History

Members of Parliament

Notes

References 

Constituencies of the Parliament of Barbados
Christ Church, Barbados
1971 establishments in Barbados
Constituencies established in 1971